Donna Foote is an author and freelance journalist. She has spent most of her career at Newsweek Magazine where she covered a range of issues and personalities both domestic and abroad.  While based in London she reported on the war in Afghanistan, Pakistan's Benazir Bhutto, tensions in the Middle East, the troubles in Northern Ireland, Diana, Princess of Wales and the British Royal Family, and UK politics and culture.  While Deputy Bureau Chief in Los Angeles, she covered the Rodney King riots and the criminal and civil trials of O. J. Simpson.  She also wrote extensively on education, health and justice issues.

In April 2008, Foote's first book, Relentless Pursuit: A Year in the Trenches with Teach for America, was published.  In it she recreated a year in the life of four Teach for America recruits at Locke High School in South Central Los Angeles, and gave a candid account of their experiences and efforts to improve the educational system.  Pulitzer Prize–winning author Robert Coles called her book a "skilled, attentive documentary work that becomes an instrument for the reader's moral and social reflection."

Foote lives in Manhattan Beach, California, with her husband Jim Shalvoy and their 21-year-old son James.

External links
 Random House Author Bookshelf
 U.S. News & World Report interview
 Article by Donna Foote

References

Living people
American women journalists
Year of birth missing (living people)
21st-century American women